Él Mató a un Policía Motorizado, also known as EMAUPM or Él Mató, is an Argentine indie rock band from La Plata established in 2003. It is formed by Santiago "Motorizado" (bass and vocals), Willy "Doctora Muerte" (drums), Manuel "Pantro Puto" (guitar), Gustavo "Niño Elefante" (guitar) and Chatrán Chatrán (keyboards). The band's musical influences include Pixies, Ramones, Weezer, Sonic Youth and The Velvet Underground.

History 
Él Mató was formed when Willy and Santiago were in high school. "Manuel had a band and invited me to play... we composed our own songs, after that we called Willy and then Gustavo. We passed from band to band until we formed this", said Motorizado. After releasing their debut album in 2004, the band did a trilogy of EPs dedicated, respectively, to birth, life, and death : Navidad de Reserva (2005), Un Millón de Euros (2006), and Día de los Muertos (2008). In 28 November 2012 Él Mató releases their second studio album, La Dinastía Scorpio.

Name origin 
The band's name comes from a line in Spanish from the 1987 film R.O.T.O.R. Santiago Motorizado told in an interview: "We picked a strange name that made fun of the typical band or artists' names. One day we were watching a bad movie, with a subtitle "Él mató a un policia motorizado" ("That boy just killed a motorcycle cop"), and we said: that's it"

Discography

Albums 

 Él Mató a un Policía Motorizado (2004)
 La dinastía Scorpio (2012)
 La Síntesis O'Konor (2017)

EPs 

 Navidad de Reserva (2005)
 Un Millón de Euros (2006)
 Dia de los Muertos (2008) 
 Violencia (2015)

Singles 

 Tormenta Roja (2004)
 Mujeres Bellas y Fuertes (2012)
 Chica de oro (2012)
 El Tesoro (2017)
 Ahora Imagino Cosas (2017)

Compilations 
 El Nuevo Magnetismo (2003-2011) (2012)
La Otra Dimensión (2019)
Unas Vacaciones Raras (2021)

References

External links 

 (in Spanish)

Argentine musical groups
Argentine indie rock groups
Noise rock groups
Post-punk revival music groups
Musical groups established in 2003